Tybee Island is a city and a barrier island located in Chatham County, Georgia, 18 miles (29 km) east of Savannah, United States. Though the name "Tybee Island" is used for both the island and the city, geographically they are not identical: only part of the island's territory lies within the city.

The island is the easternmost point in Georgia. The famous phrase "From Rabun Gap to Tybee Light," intended to illustrate the geographic diversity of Georgia, contrasts a mountain pass near the state's northernmost point with the coastal island's famous lighthouse.

As of the 2020 census, the city's population was 3,114. The entire island is a part of the Savannah Metropolitan Statistical Area.

Officially renamed "Savannah Beach" in a publicity move at the end of the 1950s, the city of Tybee Island has since reverted to its original name. (The name "Savannah Beach" nevertheless appears on official state maps as far back as 1952 and as recently as the mid-1970s.) The small island, which has long been a quiet getaway for the residents of Savannah, has become a popular vacation spot with tourists from outside the Savannah metropolitan area. Tybee Island is home to the first of what would eventually become the Days Inn chain of hotels, the oft-photographed Tybee Island Light Station, and the Fort Screven Historic District.

It is one of the few locations where the U.S. Air Force dropped an atomic bomb—by accident (during a botched 1958 military training exercise). Though the "Tybee Bomb" did not detonate (and, according to some reports, was not armed with a fuse), there has been ongoing concern, since the Mark 15 nuclear bomb lost during the mishap was never found.

History

Native Americans, using dugout canoes to navigate the waterways, hunted and camped in Georgia's coastal islands for thousands of years. The Euchee tribe likely inhabited the island in the years preceding the arrival of the first Spanish explorers in the area in the 16th century. Tybee is the Euchee word for "salt".

In 1520, the Spanish laid claim to what is now Tybee Island and named it Los Bajos. It was at the northern end of the Guale missionary province of Spanish Florida. During that time the island was frequented by pirates who used the island to hide from those who pursued them. Pirates later used the island's inland waterways for a fresh water source. After the founding of South Carolina in 1670, warfare increased between the English and their pirate allies and the Spanish and their Native American allies. In 1702, James Moore of South Carolina led an invasion of Spanish Florida with an Indian army and a fleet of militia-manned ships. The invasion failed to take the capital of Florida, St. Augustine, but did destroy the Guale and Mocama missionary provinces. After another invasion of Spanish Florida by South Carolina in 1704, the Spanish retreated to St. Augustine and Pensacola; the Sea Islands were depopulated, allowing the establishment of new English settlements such as the colony of Georgia.

Lighthouse

Tybee Island's strategic position near the mouth of the Savannah River has made the island's northern tip the ideal location for a lighthouse since Georgia's early settlement period. The original lighthouse has been replaced several times. The second lighthouse was built in 1742 when beach erosion threatened the first. Part of the third lighthouse at the site, built in 1773, still stands as the bottom  of the present lighthouse. The top  of the current lighthouse were added in 1867.

Today, the Tybee Lighthouse is a popular tourist destination, having all of its support buildings on the  site historically preserved. The current black-and-white tower markings are a reversion to its fourth day mark, first used in 1916. The Tybee Island Light Station is one of just a handful of 18th-century lighthouses still in operation in North America.

Civil War
 

During the Civil War, the Union Army placed siege batteries along the north coast of Tybee Island that aided in their successful bombardment and capture of Fort Pulaski on April 10–11, 1862. This was the first significant use of rifled cannons against masonry fortifications and demonstrated that masonry fortifications were obsolete. Recently, the City of Tybee Island has taken action to commemorate Tybee's historic significance in the Civil War. In 2005, the city obtained a federal grant to acquire two tracts of land where Union soldiers launched their attack against Fort Pulaski.

Fort Screven historic district

Fort Screven was first commissioned in 1898 and was named for Brigadier General James Screven, a Revolutionary War hero who was killed in action near Midway, Georgia, in 1778.  The fort served as a valuable part of coastal defense until it was decommissioned in 1947. Fort Screven is most notable for one of its former commanding officers, General of the Army George C. Marshall, later the architect of the Marshall Plan that helped rebuild Western Europe after World War II. Approximately 70 fort buildings still remain.  The entire Fort Screven district was placed on the National Historic Register in 1982.  One of the most important remaining structures is the Tybee Post Theater which was constructed in 1930. It was one of the first theaters in Georgia to have sound features and was the highlight of recreational activities for the fort. Other remaining buildings include the recently restored guard house, the bakery (now a private home), and barracks (now apartments). The ruins of the beach fortifications are also extant, and of the six original batteries, Battery Garland (built in 1899) is accessible to the public. Battery Garland houses the Tybee Museum. Another remaining area is Officer's Row, an impressive group of original homes that have a sweeping ocean view. One of these homes is now a bed and breakfast.

Resort period

During the late 19th century, at the height of the Industrial Revolution, residents in large, polluted cities frequently sought out remote beaches for summertime getaways. Clear, saltwater breezes were thought to be remedies for numerous ailments, including asthma and certain allergies. Steamships began carrying patients and tourists to Tybee Island just after the Civil War. In 1887, the Central of Georgia Railway completed a line to Tybee Island, opening the island to a wave of summer tourists. The railroad built the Tybrisa Pavilion in 1891, and by the end of the decade, several hundred summer cottages dotted the island.

In the 1920s, U.S. Route 80 was completed, connecting Tybee Island via road with the mainland. The Tybrisa Pavilion became a popular stop for big band tours, and development pushed toward the island's southern tip. By 1940, the island had four hotels, including the Desoto Hotel and Hotel Tybee, and numerous smaller lodges. The Tybrisa Pavilion burned in 1967, and was replaced by the Tybee Pier and Pavilion in 1996.

Cecil B. Day opened the first Days Inn on Tybee Island in 1970.

Tybee Bomb

On February 5, 1958, a U.S. Air Force B-47 Stratojet from Homestead Air Force Base, Florida, jettisoned a nuclear weapon (specifically, a Mark 15 hydrogen bomb) off the coast of Tybee Island while conducting training exercises with a USAF F-86 Sabrejet. The aircraft collided, with the pilot of the fighter ejecting and the crew of the bomber making an emergency landing at nearby Hunter Air Force Base. The lost weapon, known popularly as the "Tybee Bomb", remained a security concern for several years, although the Air Force claims the bomb lacks a nuclear capsule and does not pose a serious threat. In 2004, retired United States Air force Lieutenant Colonel Derek Duke took part in a private search for the bomb. According to an article in the Savannah Morning News, Duke concluded that there were "high levels of radiation and unusual magnetometer readings" at a specific point in Wassaw Sound, just off the Tybee coast. Duke concluded, from these readings, that the bomb might be present "at a point just off the southern tip of Little Tybee," an undeveloped barrier island near Tybee Island. In response, the Air Force launched a nine-month search for the Tybee bomb in 2004. The search team specifically investigated the area of Wassaw Sound in which Duke had located high radiation levels. The Air Force reported to the media in 2005 that the source of the high radiation is likely to be monazite, a mineral which is naturally high in radiation. The Savannah Morning News headline ran "Duke Found Dirt".

Shark attacks

On June 15, 2016, the Tybee city council voted 4–1 to withhold shark attack numbers where the attacks did not result in loss of life.  According to an article in the "Savannah Morning News", the vote was a direct result of pressure from local businesses which had seen a decline in tourism due to recent reported shark activity.

Geography

Tybee Island is located at  (32.006672, -80.849374). The island is the north easternmost of Georgia's Sea Islands, which comprise the outer section of the state's Lower Coastal Plain region. Like the other Sea Islands, Tybee consists of a sandy beach on its eastern shore and a tidal salt marsh on its western shore. The interior consists of a maritime forest (the density of which has been reduced by development) and freshwater sloughs.

The Savannah River empties into the Atlantic Ocean just north of Tybee Island, placing the island in a crazy strategic location. To the west, the marsh-lined Lazaretto Creek splits the island off from McQueens Island (the  stretch between the main western shore of Tybee Island and Lazaretto Creek is mostly marshland). Tybee Creek flows along the south shore of Tybee Island and joins the Atlantic at the island's southeastern tip. Little Tybee Island, which consists mostly of protected wetlands, lies across Tybee Creek to the southwest. The size of the sandy beach at the southern tip of Tybee Island varies considerably in response to tidal changes.

Climate 
Tybee Island has hot weather in summer, while in winter the weather is cool with winds. Over the course of the year, the temperature typically varies from 45 °F to 88 °F and is rarely below 33 °F or above 93 °F. The below table shows the monthly average temperatures:

Demographics

2020 census

As of the 2020 United States census, there were 3,114 people, 1,305 households, and 831 families residing in the city.

2010 census
As of the census of 2010, there were 2,990 people, 1,360 households, and 772 families residing in the city. The racial makeup of the city was 93.5% White, 3.1% African American, 0.5% Native American, 1.2% Asian, 0.5% from other races, and 1.1% from two or more races. Hispanic or Latino of any race were 1.5% of the population.

There were 1,360 households, out of which 12.6% had children under the age of 18 living with them, 47.5% were married couples living together, 6.5% had a female householder with no husband present, and 43.2% were non-families. 32.1% of all households were made up of individuals, and 12.1% had someone living alone who was 65 years of age or older.  The average household size was 2.11 and the average family size was 2.65.

In the city, the population was spread out, with 11.9% under the age of 18, 6.0% from 18 to 24, 18.0% from 25 to 44, 41.3% from 45 to 64, and 22.8% who were 65 years of age or older.  The median age was 53.2 years. For every 100 females, there were 94.7 males.

The median income for a household in the city was $53,732, and the median income for a family was $67,202. Males had a median income of $41,974 versus $43,382 for females. The per capita income for the city was $35,109. About 1.5% of families and 4.2% of the population were below the poverty line, including 1.9% of those age 65 or over.

Crime rate 
Violent crime rate for Tybee for every 100 K people is lower than Georgia but property crime rate is higher. The table below shows the rate of crime per 100 thousand people.

Events 
Every year since 1987, Tybee Island has had an annual Beach Bum parade, traditionally held in May the weekend before Memorial Day weekend. The parade route comes down the main road in Tybee, Butler Avenue, and when parade floats come by onlookers have been known to shoot each other with water-guns.

Tybee Pirate Fest, which began in 2005, is typically held the weekend prior to Columbus Day.

Tybee Island was formerly home to "Orange Crush," an annual beach party attracting thousands of students from historically Black colleges and universities. The planned 2019 event was canceled after an organizer was arrested, and future events were moved to Jacksonville Beach, Florida with organizers citing "lack of resources, limited parking, civil rights violations, and political injustices."

Education

Tybee Island is part of the Savannah-Chatham County Public School System.  For the 2009 to 2010 school year, there were approximately 34,668 students in the district.

There is also a public charter school on the island.

Photo gallery

See also
 Burton 4-H Center
 Battle of Fort Pulaski

References

External links

 City of Tybee Island official website
 TybeeIsland.com

Cities in Georgia (U.S. state)
Barrier islands of Georgia (U.S. state)
Cities in Chatham County, Georgia
Savannah metropolitan area
Populated coastal places in Georgia (U.S. state)
Islands of Chatham County, Georgia
Forts in Georgia (U.S. state)